Back of My Hand may refer to:
 "Back of My Hand" (The Jags song), 1979
 "Back of My Hand" (Gemma Hayes song), 2002
 "Back of My Hand" (Rolling Stones song), 2005